Club Soccer Mont-Royal Outremont is a Canadian semi-professional soccer club based in the Montreal boroughs of Mount Royal and Outremont. Since 2013, the club has competed in the Première ligue de soccer du Québec. Their women's team has competed in the women's division of the PLSQ since 2019.

History
In 2013, the club joined the Première ligue de soccer du Québec, a Division III league, fielding a team in the men's division. During their inaugural season, they won both the League title and the League Cup.

They once again finished as league champions in 2015 and 2016. By winning the league title, they participated in the Inter-Provincial Cup, which was created in 2014, against the champion of League1 Ontario to determine the Canadian Division III champion.  In 2015, they were defeated by the Oakville Blue Devils, but in 2016, they won the title by defeating Vaughan Azzurri.

They added a team in the women's division of the PLSQ for the 2019 season with Lakers du Lac Saint-Louis, which was run by the Association Régionale de Soccer du Lac St-Louis of which they are a member, transferring their team to CSMRO.

In 2019, the club partnered with Major League Soccer club CF Montréal, joining their Centre d'identification et perfectionnement (scouting and development centre).

In 2021, they won their fourth PLSQ title, matching the record of AS Blainville, qualifying them for the 2022 Canadian Championship.

Seasons 
Men

Women

Players

Roster

Coaching staff

  Luc Brutus – head coach
  Sevan Ortaaslan – orthopedic surgeon
  Manon Coté – doctor
  Ludovic Godefroy – fitness coach
  Stephanie Liganor – physiotherapist
  Mher Nahabedian – assistant coach
  Eduard-Nick Pascalau - coach

Notable former players
The following players have either played at the professional or international level, either before or after playing for the PLSQ team:

Honours
PLSQ Championship (3): 2013, 2015, 2016, 2021
Coupe PLSQ (1): 2013
Inter-Provincial Cup (1): 2016

References

Mont-Royal Outremont
Soccer clubs in Quebec